Kathy McCord is the debut album by American singer Kathy McCord, released in 1970, the first album issued on Creed Taylor's CTI Records. The album has been re-issued on CD twice: in 1999 in Japan as Rainbow Ride and in 2011 in South Korea as Kathy McCord, both CD reissues were released without the artist's approval. However, in 2010 the whole album was included on compilation New Jersey to Woodstock, collecting 1968's single "I'll Give My Heart To You"/"I'll Never Be Alone Again" and some of her 1970s recordings.

Track listing

Personnel 
Kathy McCord – vocals
Hubert Laws – flute
Paul Harris – piano, organ
John Hall – guitar
Harvey Brooks – bass
Willis Kelly – drums
Ed Shaughnessy – drums, tabla
Don Sebesky – string and brass arrangements

Release history

References

External links

1970 debut albums
Kathy McCord albums
CTI Records albums
Albums produced by Creed Taylor
Albums recorded at Van Gelder Studio